Subai Jain temples is a group of Jain temple in Subai village of Koraput district, Odisha.

History 
Subai Jain temple complex is a group of five Jain temples built in 4th century. Subai was an important Jain center and the Jain temple were constructed Jain gemstone traders who came to Koraput region for trading. the temples are dedicated to Mahavira, Parshvanatha, Rishabhanatha and other Tirthankaras.

About temple 
The temple were initially built with triratha architecture with amalaka. The door jabs has carvings of rosette enclosed with dotted squares. One temple is famous for its rare images of the tirthankaras. The temple houses an image of Rishabhanatha in padmasan dhyāna posture; surrounded by tirthankaras. An idol of a four-armed Tara (a Jain yakshi) adorned by bangles in the temple complex is also noteworthy. A Parab festival is organised by the temple management every year. A  Jain idol was discovered in 2020 during excavation.

See also 
 Udayagiri and Khandagiri Caves

References

Citations

Sources

External links 
 

Jain temples in Odisha
4th-century Jain temples